Arne Kring (born November 17, 1942) is a Swedish former professional motocross racer. He was a top contender in the F.I.M. 500cc Motocross World Championship from 1963 to 1975.



Motocross career
Kring was born in the town of Knåda in the province of Hälsingland. Like many Swedes of his time, Kring rode Husqvarna motorcycles. Although he raced motocross professionally, his true profession was as a bicycle shop owner. At the age of 20, he entered the 1963 250cc Swedish motocross Grand Prix and scored an impressive second place finish behind the defending world champion, Torsten Hallman. After placing fourth in the 1967 250cc Swedish motocross Grand Prix, the Husqvarna factory gave Kring a motorcycle to compete with in the world championships.

Kring moved up to the premier 500cc class in 1969 riding Husqvarna's best machinery. He won his first world championship race at the 500cc Swedish Grand Prix and, followed with another victory one week later at the Dutch Grand Prix to give him the early lead in the 1969 500cc world championships. However, he failed to win again until the final race of the year at the East German Grand Prix and finished the season ranked fourth in the world as his Husqvarna teammate, Bengt Åberg won the world championship.

Kring was having the most successful season of his career in 1970 when, he led in the 500cc world championship points standings with four overall victories in the first nine rounds before he broke his back while competing in a non-championship race. His injury ended his season however, he had accumulated enough points to claim second place in the world championship behind teammate Bengt Åberg. Kring retired after the 1975 season. He won a total of seven Grand Prix victories during his professional motocross racing career.

Kring also was a member of the winning Swedish team of the Motocross des Nations in 1970 and in 1974. He was also one of the pioneers who helped to boost the exposure of motocross in the United States with participation in the Trans-AMA and Inter-AM motocross series. Kring won the 1969 Inter-AM Series.

References

External links
 Arne Kring profile

Living people
1942 births
People from Ovanåker Municipality
Swedish motocross riders
Sportspeople from Gävleborg County